Halysidota atra is a moth of the family Erebidae. It was described by Herbert Druce in 1884. It is found in Guatemala, Mexico, Honduras, Costa Rica, Nicaragua, Panama, Peru, Colombia, Ecuador and Bolivia.

Subspecies
Halysidota atra atra (Guatemala, Mexico, Honduras, Costa Rica, Nicaragua, Panama, Colombia)
Halysidota atra rindgei Watson, 1980 (Peru, Colombia, Ecuador, Bolivia)

References

 

Halysidota
Moths described in 1884